Cody Coughlin (born December 11, 1995) is an American professional stock car racing driver who competes part-time in the ARCA Menards Series, driving the No. 72 Ford Fusion, and part-time in the ARCA/CRA Super Series and CARS Pro Late Model Tour, driving the No. 1 Toyota/Chevrolet, both for his family team, Coughlin Brothers Racing. He has also competed in the NASCAR Camping World Truck Series in the past.

Racing career
Coughlin started his career in drag racing, competing in the National Hot Rod Association's Jr. Drag Racing League, but eventually switched to oval track racing. He began in USAC quarter midgets, winning five races in 2009. The following year, he switched to Late models, and joined the JEGS/CRA All-Stars in 2011. In eleven races, Coughlin finished in the top ten in all but one, while also recording four top-five finishes with a best finish of second at Rockford Speedway. He was later named the series' Rookie of the Year. In 2013, he won the series championship.

On March 5, 2014, Coughlin was signed to Joe Gibbs Racing's driver development program.

In March 2014, Coughlin joined Venturini Motorsports for an ARCA Racing Series test at Motor Mile Speedway, followed by another test at Mobile International Speedway, and he made his series debut at the latter on March 22. After qualifying eighth, he finished 13th. He made ten more starts in the season, with a best finish of fourth at Kansas Speedway and Kentucky Speedway. On the green–white–checker finish, he finished second after a three-wide battle to the finish.

On July 9, 2015, Coughlin made his Camping World Truck Series debut at Kentucky, driving the No. 25 Toyota Tundra for Venturini Motorsports. Due to rain canceling practice and qualifying, he never turned a lap around the track until the race, where he finished 20th. He later debuted for Kyle Busch Motorsports at Michigan International Speedway, driving the No. 54 Tundra, where he finished 20th after being involved in a late wreck with Ben Kennedy.

In 2016, Coughlin drove for KBM in the No. 18 Tundra for one race at Daytona International Speedway, while also running ten races in the No. 51, splitting the truck with Daniel Suárez. At the Texas Motor Speedway race, Coughlin took over for John Wes Townley in the No. 05 Chevrolet Silverado of Athenian Motorsports while Townley was nursing an ankle injury.

On January 30, 2017, Coughlin joined ThorSport Racing full-time, driving the No. 13 Toyota and bringing JEGS over to sponsor him.

For 2018, Coughlin joined GMS Racing to drive their No. 2 truck full-time. However, on September 24, he was released due to sponsorship issues.

After being unable to find a ride in NASCAR after being released from GMS, Coughlin returned to regional pro late model racing.

On August 2, 2022, it was revealed that Coughlin would return to ARCA to drive in the race at Michigan. He will compete in the race with a team owned by his family. It is his first start in the series since 2015 and first start in NASCAR since 2018.

Personal life
In his family, Coughlin is a third-generation racer. Coughlin's grandfather Jeg Coughlin, Sr. founded Jegs High Performance, with Jeg and relatives like Cody's father John competing in drag racing; uncle Jeg Jr. is also a drag racer.

Coughlin began to work in real estate development after he was unable to find another full-time ride in NASCAR after being released from GMS Racing. He helped plan the building of an apartment complex near New Albany, Ohio in 2022.

In media
Coughlin makes a cameo appearance in the 2018 film God Bless the Broken Road. For that year's Truck race at Michigan International Speedway, he ran a paint scheme promoting the movie.

Motorsports career results

NASCAR
(key) (Bold – Pole position awarded by qualifying time. Italics – Pole position earned by points standings or practice time. * – Most laps led.)

Camping World Truck Series

ARCA Menards Series
(key) (Bold – Pole position awarded by qualifying time. Italics – Pole position earned by points standings or practice time. * – Most laps led.)

 Season still in progress

References

External links
 
 

1995 births
Living people
NASCAR drivers
ARCA Menards Series drivers
People from Delaware, Ohio
Racing drivers from Ohio
Kyle Busch Motorsports drivers